Paper sons or paper daughters is a term used to refer to Chinese people who were born in China and illegally immigrated to the United States and Canada by purchasing documentation which stated that they were blood relatives to Chinese people who had already received U.S. or Canadian citizenship or residency. Typically it would be relation by being a son or a daughter. Several historical events such as the Chinese Exclusion Act and San Francisco earthquake of 1906 caused the illegal documents to be produced.

Background 
With the U.S. Chinese Exclusion Act enacted in 1882, and the Canadian Chinese Immigration Acts enacted in 1885 and 1923, Chinese people were largely excluded from entering the United States and Canada from China.

In the United States
The Chinese Exclusion Act was the only law in American history to deny naturalization in or entry into the United States based upon a specific ethnicity or country of birth, though it was not the only law to deny citizenship based on ethnicity or country of birth (as Native- and African-American, among other Non-White American, people had at various times been denied citizenship based upon ethnicity; and not every American who was born overseas to at least one American parent was granted by-birth citizenship until the passage of the 1952 Immigration and Naturalization Act). It stated that the coming of Chinese laborers would endanger the order of localities. As the American economy plummeted, problems of unemployment arose and blame was placed upon the Chinese for taking over jobs for low pay. In 1892, this act was renewed for another ten years in the form of the Geary Act. It was eventually made permanent in 1902.

In 1906, the San Francisco earthquake caused a huge fire that destroyed public birth documents. Suddenly a new opportunity for citizenship arose: Chinese men who were already in the United States could claim that they were born in the United States. Other Chinese men would travel back to China as United States citizens and report that their wives had given birth to a son. Consequently, this made the child eligible to be a United States citizen, for which they would receive a document. These documents could then be used for their actual sons, or sold to friends, neighbors, and strangers. This was termed as a "slot" and would then be available for purchase to men who had no blood relationships in the United States in order to be eligible to enter the United States. Merchant brokers often acted as middlemen to handle the sale of slots.

To truly enforce the Chinese Exclusion Act, an Immigration Station located in Angel Island in 1910, questioned and interrogated immigrants coming from 84 different countries with the majority of immigrants being Asian and Chinese, being the largest ethnic group at the time of establishment. Since official records were often non-existent, an interrogation process was created to determine if the immigrants were related as they had claimed. On average an interrogation process could take up to 2–3 weeks, but some immigrants were interrogated for months. Questions could include details of the immigrant's home and village as well as specific knowledge of his or her ancestors. These questions had been anticipated and thus, irrespective of the true nature of the relationship to their sponsor, the applicant had prepared months in advance by committing these details to memory. Their witnesses—usually other family members living in the United States—would be called forward to corroborate these answers. Any deviation from the testimony would prolong questioning or throw the entire case into doubt and put the applicant at risk of deportation, and possibly everyone else in the family connected to the applicant as well. A detention center was in operation for thirty years; however, there were many concerns about the sanitation and safety of the immigrants at Angel Island, which proved to be true in 1940 when the administration building burned down. As a result, all the immigrants were relocated to another facility. The Chinese Exclusion Act was eventually repealed in 1943.

When ships arrived in San Francisco, travelers were separated based on their nationality. Europeans and other first or second-class ticket holders were allowed to disembark, while Asian and other immigrants or those who had health concerns and were in need for quarantine were sent to Angel island for processing. 
The living conditions at Angel island were not to be desired. A poem that was engraved on the Angel island immigration Station wooden wall describes the difficult conditions that they were kept under. The poem indicates they had been kept in a wooden house for weeks on end, and all that could be done was to wait for the voice to call for interrogation.

In Canada 
The Chinese Immigration Act prohibited most Chinese immigration to Canada beginning in 1923. All ethnic Chinese people in Canada were required to register with the government and were issued a number called a C.I.45, including both immigrants and Canadian-born Chinese. The C.I.45 was a continuation of earlier registration cards issued to Chinese people in Canada, beginning with the C.I.5 which was issued beginning in 1885 to indicate whether they had paid the Chinese Head Tax to enter Canada. 

Even native-born Chinese-Canadians were required to register and issued C.I.28 certificates. Some Chinese people in Canada sold their certificates to prospective immigrants in China so that they could use these documents to enter Canada, assuming the identity of the original certificate holder. This is where the terms “paper son” and “paper daughter” came from, with immigrants posing as relatives of others using the C.I. they purchased.

Even after the repeal of the Chinese Immigration Acts, it was difficult for people of Chinese origin to immigrate into Canada. They were required to be sponsored by either a father, mother, or spouse.

Life after immigration 
In 1957, the US government created a "confession program" that asked Chinese immigrants who had arrived in the US as paper sons and paper daughters to confess in return for legitimate citizenship. The confession required both self-report and reporting on friends, neighbors, business associates or even family members. In addition, if one could report any communist movement, that would be considered into the amnesty policy. This created a rift between those in the Chinese immigrant community. 

Paper sons and paper daughters faced challenges in their daily lives including school, work, and marriage. Documentations required actions that were particularly difficult for these paper sons and daughters, limiting their options.

The state of California formally apologized to thousands of Chinese immigrants who helped build the state while facing persistent racism and debilitating laws targeting them in 2009.

After the Chinese Exclusion Act
After China became a World War II ally, that vast power over non-citizens was deployed in raids against immigrants of various ethnic groups whose politics were considered suspect. Many paper sons suddenly faced the exposure of their fraudulent documentations. The United States government was tipped off by an informer in Hong Kong as part of a cold war effort to stop illegal immigration. Many paper sons were scared of being deported back to China. Only in the 1960s did new legislation broaden immigration from Asia and gave paper sons a chance to tell the truth about who they were and restore their real names in "confessional" programs, but many chose to stick with their adopted names for fear of retribution and took their true names to their graves. Many paper sons never told their descendants about their past, leaving them with confusion and disconnecting them from their family history. Some paper sons even went as far as adopting the American lifestyle by not teaching their children their home dialects and forgetting any Chinese cultural aspects such as their cultural foods and rituals.

Notable people 
This is a partial list of people who were paper sons or daughters:
 Tyrus Wong – Chinese-born American artist. His paper son name was Look Tai Yow.

 Jim Wong-Chu  –  Canadian author, poet, and community activist of Chinese descent.  Jim Wong-Chu came to Canada in 1953 at age four as a paper son, to live with his aunt and uncle in British Columbia.

See also

 Chinese Confession Program
 Last Night at the Telegraph Club, a 2021 novel by Malinda Lo, which includes discussion of a paper son

References

Chinese-American history
Immigration to the United States